Helen Langehanenberg (born 21 May 1982 in Münster) is a German dressage rider competing at Olympic level. On 7 August 2012 Langehanenberg, riding Damon Hill, was a member of the team which won the silver medal in the team dressage event.

References

External links 
 
 
 
 

Living people
1982 births
German female equestrians
German dressage riders
Olympic equestrians of Germany
Equestrians at the 2012 Summer Olympics
Olympic silver medalists for Germany
Olympic medalists in equestrian
Sportspeople from Münster
Medalists at the 2012 Summer Olympics